

Pre-war

1592

1593

1594

1596

1597

1598

See also
List of battles during the Japanese invasions of Korea (1592–1598)
List of naval battles during the Japanese invasions of Korea (1592–1598)
Military history of Korea
Naval history of Korea
Military history of Japan
Military history of China (pre-1911)

References
이민웅 [Lee, Min-Woong], 임진왜란 해전사 [Imjin Wae-ran Haejeonsa: The Naval Battles of the Imjin War], 청어람미디어 [Chongoram Media], 2004, .

Bibliography

 
 
 
 
 
 
 
 
 
 
 桑田忠親 [Kuwata, Tadachika], ed., 舊參謀本部編纂, [Kyu Sanbo Honbu], 朝鮮の役 [Chousen no Eki]　(日本の戰史 [Nihon no Senshi] Vol. 5), 1965.
 
 
 
 
 
 
 
 
 
 
 
 
  
 
 
 
 
 
 

Japanese invasions of Korea (1592–1598)
Japanese invasions of Korea (1592-1598), Timeline of